Virginia's 33rd Senate district is one of 40 districts in the Senate of Virginia. It has been represented by Democrat Jennifer Boysko since a 2019 special election to replace fellow Democrat Jennifer Wexton, who had been elected to Congress.

Geography
District 33 is split between Loudoun and Fairfax Counties in the suburbs of Washington D.C., including some or all of Leesburg, Cascades, Ashburn, Sterling, Brambleton, McNair, and Herndon. Washington Dulles International Airport is also within the district lines.

The district overlaps with Virginia's 10th and 11th congressional districts, and with the 10th, 32nd, 33rd, 34th, 36th, 67th, 86th, and 87th districts of the Virginia House of Delegates. It borders the state of Maryland.

Recent election results

2019

2019 special

2015

2014 special

2011

Federal and statewide results in District 33

Historical results
All election results below took place prior to 2011 redistricting, and thus were under different district lines.

2007

2006 special

2003

1999

1998 special

1995

List of members

References

Virginia Senate districts
Government in Fairfax County, Virginia
Government in Loudoun County, Virginia